Samuel Greenhalgh (July 1882 – 1955) was an English footballer who played as a centre half in the Football League with Bolton Wanderers and Aston Villa in the early 20th-century.

He was a member of the Bolton Wanderers team which finished as runners-up in the 1904 FA Cup Final.

References

1882 births
Footballers from Bolton
1955 deaths
Association football central defenders
Bolton Wanderers F.C. players
Aston Villa F.C. players
Chorley F.C. players
English Football League players
English Football League representative players
Association football midfielders
English footballers
FA Cup Final players